Sophie Cookson  (born 1989 or 1990) is an English actress best known for portraying secret agent Roxanne "Roxy" Morton / Lancelot in the 2014 spy film Kingsman: The Secret Service and its 2017 sequel Kingsman: The Golden Circle, and for playing the title role of Christine Keeler in the BBC One drama series, The Trial of Christine Keeler.

Early life
Cookson was brought up in Sussex and later Suffolk where she attended Woodbridge School. She was involved in singing and musical theatre since childhood. After being part of a theatre company that had  toured Japan, she decided to quit acting to study art history and Arabic at the University of Edinburgh. However, she soon dropped out to pursue an acting career and attended the Oxford School of Drama for three years, and graduated in 2013.

Career
While still attending Oxford Drama School in her senior year, she was cast as Grace Mohune in the Sky 1 miniseries Moonfleet, based on the J. Meade Falkner novel of the same name. In early 2014, she appeared in the film adaption of the Rosamunde Pilcher novel Unknown Heart produced by German television network ZDF, portraying Millie Lancaster. The same year, she also landed her first big screen role, replacing Emma Watson for the part of secret agent Roxanne "Roxy" Morton / Lancelot in the spy film Kingsman: The Secret Service, based on the comic book The Secret Service by Mark Millar and Dave Gibbons. Also in 2014, Cookson was cast in the female main role in Lee Tamahori's action epic Emperor, about a young woman seeking revenge for the execution of her father by Holy Roman Emperor Charles V, opposite Adrien Brody as the titular Emperor. The movie was finished and screened at Cannes in 2017 but its release has been  by legal challenges.

In 2016, she appeared in the film The Huntsman: Winter's War in a minor role as the female huntsman Pippa. Beginning in June 2017, she appeared in the Netflix series Gypsy as troubled singer Sidney Pierce. However, the series was cancelled in August after just one season due to negative reviews and low ratings, even though the second season had already been in development. In July, she appeared in the horror film The Crucifixion, playing a journalist investigating a lethal exorcism performed on a nun, and in September of the same year, she reprised her role as Roxy Morton in the sequel to The Secret Service, The Golden Circle, while also appearing in a musical short for the song Pleader by British indie rock group alt-J. 

In 2018, she played Dottie in the Trafalgar Studios production of the play Killer Joe, alongside Orlando Bloom.

Personal life 
In 2017, she met actor Stephen Campbell Moore on the set of Red Joan. Cookson and Moore reportedly began dating in November 2018. They have one child together, born in 2020.

Filmography

Film

Television

Awards and nominations

References

External links

Year of birth missing (living people)
Place of birth missing (living people)
Living people
Actresses from Sussex
Alumni of the University of Edinburgh
Alumni of the Oxford School of Drama
English film actresses
People from Haywards Heath
English television actresses
21st-century English actresses